How late it was, how late is a 1994 stream-of-consciousness novel written by Scottish writer James Kelman. The Glasgow-centred work is written in a working-class Scottish dialect, and follows Sammy, a shoplifter and ex-convict.

It won the 1994 Booker Prize.

Plot summary
Sammy awakens in a lane one morning after a two-day drinking binge, and gets into a fight with some plainclothes policemen, called in Glaswegian dialect "sodjers". When he regains consciousness, he finds that he has been beaten severely and, he gradually realises, is completely blind. The plot of the novel follows Sammy as he explores and comes to terms with his new-found disability, and the difficulties this brings.

Upon being released Sammy goes back to his house and realises that his girlfriend, Helen, is gone. He assumes that she took off because of the fight they had before Sammy last left his house, but makes no attempt to find her.
 
For a while, Sammy struggles with the simple tasks that blindness makes difficult. Soon, Sammy realises he will need something to indicate his blindness to other people. He cuts the head off of an old mop and, with the help of his neighbour, Boab, paints it white. He also purchases a pair of sunglasses to cover his eyes.

Eventually, Sammy finds himself at the Central Medical waiting to get checked out for his blindness. He is instructed to the Dysfunctional Benefits floor and is questioned by a young lady who asks Sammy questions about his blindness. Sammy tells her about being beaten up by the cops, but immediately regrets telling her this and tries to take it back. She informs him that she cannot remove his statement from the record, but he can clarify if he wishes to. This upsets Sammy and he leaves the Central Medical without finishing filing for dysfunctional benefits.

Once home Sammy decides to calm down by taking a bath. While in the bathtub Sammy hears someone enter his flat. When he goes to investigate he is cuffed by police and taken to the department. They question him about the Saturday before Sammy went blind, and about the Leg (an old friend/associate). Sammy cannot remember much about that Saturday but admits to having met up with his friends Billy and Tam. Sammy says he can remember nothing else, so they throw him in a cell.

Later Sammy is released for his doctor's appointment. The doctor asks Sammy a series of questions about his vision, and in the end, refuses to diagnose Sammy as blind. Upon leaving the doctor's office, a young man, Ally, approaches Sammy. He seems to know all about how the doctor will not give out diagnoses and persuades Sammy that he should be his representation for a commission payment.

Bored at home Sammy decides to go down to Quinn's bar, the bar Helen worked at. Sammy gets his neighbour, Boab, to call him a taxi to take him to the city centre. At the door of Quinn's bar, Sammy is told by two men that there is a promotion going on inside and Sammy cannot go in. Sammy gets upset at this and asks about Helen. The men tell Sammy that no one by the name of "Helen" has ever worked there. Upset, Sammy walks to Glancy's bar—his favourite hang out—and is approached by his old friend Tam. Tam is upset because Sammy gave his name to the police and now his family is being affected by it. Angry, Tam leaves Sammy who wonders what is going on.

Later, Ally sends over Sammy's son, Peter, to take pictures of the marks Sammy has from being beaten by the police. Peter arrives with his friend, Keith, and offers to give Sammy money. Sammy refuses the money but Peter keeps pestering him about it. Eventually, Sammy agrees to take the money and meets with Peter and Keith at a nearby pub. After Peter leaves Sammy takes the money, flags a taxi, and leaves.

Characters

Sammy
As the main character, the novel centres on Sammy's thoughts, life, and the obstacles he encounters. Sammy Samuels is a 38-year-old male Glaswegian from the Scottish working class. Sammy dictates his thoughts in working Scottish dialect, which includes frequent usage of obscenity. Sammy was married once, right after his first term in prison. Even though the marriage did not last (due to how young both Sammy and his ex were, and probably his anger and drinking) Sammy and his ex-wife have a 15-year-old son together, Peter. After his failed marriage and a few more terms in jail, Sammy moved in with his girlfriend Helen. The book opens with Sammy waking up after passing out drunk in an alley. Right from the beginning, the reader sees the drinking tendencies of Sammy and how impulsive actions control his life. His drinking binge leads to him passing out, which leads to him waking up and punching an officer, which ultimately leads to Sammy getting beaten and thrown in jail, where he wakes up blind. Sammy's character is someone who acts on impulses, not really seeing the consequences he may be creating in the future, and has a hard time creating and maintaining emotional relationships with people (this is seen through his failed marriage, Helen going missing, and the relationship with his son). As the novel progresses, you see him searching for his independence and ability to be responsible for himself. Yet at the end, it is undecided whether he has found them or not.

Ally
Ally enters the book while Sammy is at Central Medical in the Sight Loss Department, filing for dysfunctional benefits. In simple terms, Ally is a lawyer; however, he refers to himself as "representation" for Sammy. Ally offers to help Sammy file his complaint about dysfunctional benefits, believing he has a good chance of winning and making his life a little bit easier. This character challenges Sammy's character with his kindness and purity of heart. From their meeting, Ally only offers to help Sammy and improve his quality of life—something Sammy does not do for himself or others. He also promises that he will take no money unless Sammy himself wins money, showing the depth of his kindness. Ally is a married man, with a family to care for, but he still keeps himself involved in the lives of his clients. Ally approaches Sammy to help him multiple times and even offers to meet him whenever is most convenient for Sammy. Ally comes across as a caring, honest, respectable guy, and his character only comes into question once during the story when Sammy's son tells Sammy he thought Ally was a cop when he talked to him on the phone. Even though suspicions about Ally arise in the end, he offers a good contrast to Sammy's selfish tendencies throughout the book.

Peter
Although Peter has a very small part in the book, he still contributes to the depiction of Sammy's character and the plot of the novel. Peter is Sammy's teenage son, who cares deeply for his father and goes out of his way to help him. Due to the story being narrated through Sammy's point of view, it is hard for the reader to exactly infer Peter's true emotions towards his father, but it is obvious through his actions that he does love his father. The love that Peter shows towards his father (who has been absent throughout most of his life) as he goes out of his way to help him contrast with Sammy's emotionless character. Peter tells Sammy that he wants to go to England with him; however, Sammy tells him the timing is not right and he might let him meet up in a few years if he still wants to. Peter risks a lot at the end of the book while trying to help his father, but Sammy leaves him behind without saying goodbye. At the end of the book the reader is left wondering what happens with Peter and if it would still be possible for him to care deeply about his father.

Booker Prize
The book, amid some controversy, won the Booker Prize for 1994, making Kelman the first Scottish writer to win the award. One of the judges, Rabbi Julia Neuberger, allegedly threatened to resign from the judging panel if the book was selected as the winner, and is widely quoted as having said, "Frankly, it's crap." Neuberger described the Booker decision as a "disgrace" and said: "I'm really unhappy. Kelman is deeply inaccessible for a lot of people. I am implacably opposed to the book. I feel outmanoeuvred."

Simon Jenkins, a conservative columnist for The Times, called the award "literary vandalism". In his acceptance speech, Kelman countered the criticism and decried its basis as suspect, making the case for the culture and language of "indigenous" people outwith London. "A fine line can exist between elitism and racism," he said. "On matters concerning language and culture, the distinction can sometimes cease to exist altogether."

Kingsley Amis took offence to the book in his The King's English. In a section on "Four-letter Words", Amis contests that "The thinning-out of spoken ribaldry" is a bad thing for the worlds of literature, art, comedy, and culture. Amis said: "An entire way of being funny, an entire range of humorous effects, has been impoverished, except probably on the lower deck of society. At first sight, the case with the printed four-letter word is different, though here I detect a similarly unwelcome drift towards serious aesthetic purpose. A bit of that can be seen in one of the last and least of the big fuck-novels, the winner of the 1994 Booker Prize. The doggedness with which the author keeps on trotting out the great word and its various derivatives already has something old-fashioned about it. Time for a change."

In 2020, Douglas Stuart – the second Scottish writer to win the Booker Prize with his novel Shuggie Bain – said: "How Late It Was How Late by James Kelman changed my life. It is such a bold book, the prose and stream of consciousness is really inventive. But it is also one of the first times I saw my people, my dialect, on the page."

References

Booker Prize-winning works
Scottish novels
1994 British novels
Novels set in Glasgow
Secker & Warburg books
Novels about blindness
Novels by James Kelman
Novels about diseases and disorders
Scots-language works
Stream of consciousness novels